Stock Holding Corporation of India Limited (SHCIL) is an Indian custodian and depository participant, based in Navi Mumbai, Maharashtra. SHCIL was established in 1986 as a public limited company and is a subsidiary of IFCI. It is also responsible for e-stamping system around India. It is also authorised by Reserve Bank of India as Agency Bank to distribute and receive Govt. of India savings/relief bond 2003 along with nationalized banks.

Corporate structure
The Stock Holding Corporation has three subsidiaries:
 Stockholding Services Ltd (stock brokering services)
 StockHolding Document Management Services Limited (provides end-to-end document storage and digitization services)
 StockHolding Securities IFSC Limited (A SEBI registered intermediary operating out of GIFT IFSC, Gandhinagar, Gujarat, and catering to Eligible Foreign Investors (EFIs), FPIs and NRIs from FATF compliant jurisdictions as of now)

Operations

Domestic presence
SHCIL has over 200 branches and in 141 cities around India.

GIFT IFSC presence
SHCIL's subsidiary, StockHolding Securities IFSC Limited, is operating out of India's first International Financial Services Centre at GIFT City, Gandhinagar, Gujarat, catering to EFIs (Eligible Foreign Investors), FPIs & NRIs from FATF compliant jurisdictions as of now.

E-Stamping
The main e-stamping facility was opened on 3 July 2008 in New Delhi, India and was inaugurated by Chief Minister Sheila Dikshit.
The goal of the e-stamp was to "prevent paper and process-related fraudulent practices" according to the SHICL chairman and managing director at that time, RC Razdan.
It implemented the e-stamping facility in five cities of Gujarat – Ahmedabad, Gandhinagar, Surat, Rajkot and Baroda – as well as Bangalore, in March 2008.

Products and services
Stock Holding offers numerous financial services along three main branches: personal, corporate and custodial services.

Personal services
Some of the personal services they offer include:
 Demat Account
 Insurance
 Mutual Funds
 NPS (Retirement)
 GOI Bonds (Government of India)
 IPOs
 Stock Holding

GoldRush
A platform that allows users to buy gold online and is one of the only two ways to do so in India.

Corporate services
 Demat services for business
 CSGL services (government bonds)
 Trading accounts
 NPS accounts
 Bullion (gold and silver)

Custodial services
Custodial services include any safekeeping, administration, transaction and further activities done on behalf of a company by its custodian, and include:

 Fund accounting
 FDI (Foreign Direct Investment)
 Company Valuation
 Vaults
 Customized Reporting
 Electronic and Physical Safekeeping Services
 Clearing and Settlement Services

References

External links
Time Of India | Delhi to scrap stamp paper altogether
Official Website

Central securities depositories of India
Financial services companies based in Mumbai
Indian companies established in 1986
Financial services companies established in 1986
Holding companies established in 1986
1986 establishments in Maharashtra